The Institute for Women's Policy Research (IWPR) is a non-profit research organization based in Washington, D.C., founded in 1987 by Heidi Hartmann.

History 
The IWPR was founded in 1987 by feminist and MacArthur Fellowship Award recipient Heidi Hartmann.

Activities
IWPR publishes reports, fact sheets, and research-in-briefs with women as the central point of analysis; its research addresses issues of race, ethnicity, and socioeconomic status and focuses specifically on policies that help women achieve social, economic, and political equality. The research serves as a resource to policymakers, providing background and context for present and future policy agendas impacting women in the United States and internationally.

Program Areas

Employment, Economic Change & Education
IWPR examines the quality of jobs and explores access to employment benefits. IWPR tracks the gender wage gap over time. IWPR also focuses on education, as women need more education to reach the same average income levels as men due to the gender wage gap.

Democracy and Society
IWPR analyzes data at the local, state and federal levels to identify strategies to encourage women’s participation in civic and political life.

Poverty, Welfare and Income Security
IWPR has researches on women's income security and suggests improvements to planning and policies that take into consideration the welfare of women.

Work and Family
IWPR aims to improve access to child care and measure workplace flexibility.

Health and Safety
IWPR identifies gender and racial/ethnic disparities in health outcomes and access to health care services and highlights opportunities for improvement.

IWPR Projects and Initiatives

Status of Women in the States Reports
IWPR has analyzed data on a wide range of indicators at the local, state and federal levels, including demographics, economic security, educational attainment, reproductive rights, political participation, civic engagement, and access to health care and work support in order to publish a collection of comprehensive reports. Each report offers policy recommendations shaped by the research findings for that state, city or area.

Student Parent Success Initiative
The Student Parent Success Initiative focuses on supporting students with dependent children who are pursuing college education, funded by the Bill & Melinda Gates Foundation.

References

External links
IWPR website

Women's organizations based in the United States
Research institutes in Washington, D.C.
Political and economic think tanks in the United States
Think tanks based in Washington, D.C.
Gender studies organizations
Non-profit organizations based in the United States